The men's pole vault at the 2018 European Athletics Championships took place at the Olympic Stadium on 10 and 12 August.

Records

 
The following national records were established during the competition:

Schedule

Summary
The top five European vaulters, all in the top eight in the world, all met in this competition.  World record holder Renaud Lavillenie came in ranked #2 in the world for 2018.  Paweł Wojciechowski collected misses first, then at 5.80m, eighteen year old Armand Duplantis missed once and Lavillenie missed twice before passing, leaving Piotr Lisek and Timur Morgunov retaining a perfect record to that point, with the lead.  Wojciechowski topped out at 5.80m, while Lavillenie redeemed himself with a clearance of 5.85m in his one remaining attempt.  Lisek missed once at 5.85m then passed while Morgunov remained perfect to take over the lead.  Lisek, Duplantis and Morgunov all took 5.90m on their first attempt, Lavillenie passed and elected to take his next attempt at 5.95m.  At 5.95m, Duplantis cleared first, improving his own World under 20 (Junior) record.  He took over the lead when Morgunov missed for the first time in the competition.  Lavillenie made his first attempt to move into second place (with two misses to Duplantis' one).  Morgunov and Lisek passed after their first misses at 5.95m, taking four athletes to attempt the magic 6 meters.

Lisek missed, then Duplantis made it on his first attempt, becoming the youngest athlete to join the 6 metres club, setting the World under 20 record for the second time in the competition.  As the next jumper, Morgunov became the 24th member of the club with his first attempt clearance and he moved into a tie for the lead.  Lavillenie missed his first attempt and passed, then Lisek bowed out of the competition with his second miss bringing three athletes to the next prescribed height of 6.05m, a height only five athletes had ever cleared.  On his first attempt, Duplantis sailed well over the bar and became the sixth, again improving his U20 record from minutes earlier, the third time in the competition, taking the lead.  With his success, it was hugs from all the leading members of the pole vault fraternity, save Morgunov who was on the runway preparing for his next attempt.  Neither Morgunov or Lavillenie could clear 6.05m, leaving Duplantis with gold, Morgunov with silver and Lavillenie with bronze.  Duplantis chose not to make any more attempts at a higher height.  Duplantis also broke Rodion Gataullin's 24 year old European championship record which both he and Morgunov had tied at 6 metres.

Results

Qualification
Qualification: 5.66 m (Q) or best 12 performances (q)

Final

Notes

References
Start List 

Pole vault
Pole vault at the European Athletics Championships